The fourth season of The Voice Kids is a Ukrainian reality singing show competition on 1+1. Dmitriy Monatik returned to the show as coach. Natalia Mogilevskaya returned to the show after a one-year absence. Aleksey Zavgorodniy and Nadya Dorofeeva Vremya i Steklo shared the third coach position under their band name Vremya i Steklo. The show was hosted by Yuri Gorbunov and Katerina Osadcha.

The show premiered on November 5, 2017. There were 7 episodes. The finale aired on December 17, 2017

Coaches

 – Winning coach/contestant. Winners are in bold,eliminated contestants in small font.
 – Runner-up coach/contestant. Final contestant first listed.

Teams
Colour key

Blind auditions
During the Blind auditions, each coach must now form a team of 12 young artists.

It aired from November 5

Color key

Episode 1 (November 5)

The performance by Daneliya Tuleshova was acclaimed by Natalia Mogilevskaya as the best performance in the history of The Voice Kids Ukraine. It got 6 million views and 9000 comments on YouTube within one month.

Episode 2 ( November 12)

Episode 3 (November 19)

Episode 4 (November 26)

The Battle rounds
After the Blind Auditions, each coach had twelve contestants for the Battle rounds. Coaches begin narrowing down the playing field by training the contestants. Each battle concluding with the respective coach eliminating two of the three contestants; the four winners for each coach advanced to the Knockouts.

Color key

Episode 5 (December 3)

Knockouts 
Color key:

Episode 6 (December 10)

Final

Episode 7 (December 17)

Round 1 
In this phase of the competition, each of the top six finalists took the stage and performed a solo song. The television audience choose the final three artists who advanced to the next round.

Color key:

There were four performances between round one and two, which were not part of the competition. Each coach performed with their
two candidates. Also, Monatik performed a song "Batka" he has specifically composed for this competition.

Round 2 
The final round of the competition featured the top three finalists performed a solo song. Before the start of the performances, voting lines were opened live-in-show for the television audience to vote for the final three and decide the winner. The winner of The Voice Kids was announced at the end of the show.
In addition to the title the winner received a one-week vacation at Disneyland Paris for two persons and a three-month rotation of their songs on Nashe Radio

References 

2017 Ukrainian television seasons
The Voice of Ukraine